Elizabeth Reid Boyd (born 24 August 1968) is a Scottish born author and academic in Gender Studies at Edith Cowan University in Western Australia whose romance fiction is published by Harlequin under her natural pen name Eliza Redgold. She defends the romance novel as a form of feminism.

References 

1968 births
Living people
Academic staff of Edith Cowan University
Scottish romantic fiction writers
Australian romantic fiction writers
Australian women academics
Australian social scientists